Aznel bin Ibrahim is a Malaysian politician from UMNO. He has been the Member of Perak State Legislative Assembly for Pengkalan Hulu from 2013 to November 2022.

Education 
He had studied in SK Kroh, SM Tun Saban and Alor Setar Technical High School. He is also an Executive MBA.

Politics 
He is currently the Deputy chief of UMNO Gerik branch. He was the Political Secretary of Menteri Besar of Perak, Ahmad Faizal Azumu. He was also a Committee Member and Vice Chief of UMNO Gerik branch.

Election result

Honours 
  :
  Member of the Order of the Defender of the Realm (AMN) (2010)
  :
  Knight Commander of the Order of the Perak State Crown (DPMP) – Dato' (2017)

References 

United Malays National Organisation politicians
Members of the Perak State Legislative Assembly
Malaysian people of Malay descent
Living people
Year of birth missing (living people)
Members of the Order of the Defender of the Realm